Basna is a  town in Mahasamund district in the Chhattisgarh state of India.

Geography 
It has an average elevation of 266 metres (872 feet).

History 
The people also claim that during the Mahabharata period, the Pandavas had also stayed here. Narsinghnath pitha is an example of religious and cultural synthesis of tribal and non-tribal people (Pasayat, 1998, 2003, 2005 2007, 2008).

Demographics 
 India census, Basna had a population of 12368. Males constitute 54% of the population and females 46%. Basna has an average literacy rate of 76%, higher than the national average of 59.5%; with 57% of the males and 43% of females literate. 14% of the population is under 6 years of age.

References 

Cities and towns in Mahasamund district